Thomas Howard, 5th Duke of Norfolk (9 March 162713 December 1677) was an English nobleman.

Thomas Howard was born to Henry Frederick Howard, 22nd Earl of Arundel and Elizabeth Stuart, Countess of Arundel. His maternal grandfather was Esmé Stewart, 3rd Duke of Lennox.

In 1660 King Charles II, acting on a virtually unanimous petition from the House of Lords, recreated for him the dukedom of Norfolk, which had been forfeited for treason by his great-great-grandfather Thomas Howard in 1572.

Thomas had significant mental disabilities that prevented him from marrying or exercising his privileges as Duke. He spent much of his life in a private asylum in Padua, Italy. Thomas' brother, Sir Henry Howard served as Earl Marshal until Thomas died in 1677, then succeeded him as Duke. Another brother, Philip, became a Catholic cardinal.

Family tree

References

|-

|-

1627 births
1677 deaths
17th-century English nobility
Alumni of St John's College, Cambridge
305
Thomas Howard, 05th Duke of Norfolk
23
306
3rd Earl of Norfolk
Barons Mowbray
20
13
Barons Talbot
Royalty and nobility with disabilities
English people with disabilities
English expatriates in Italy
Barons Strange of Blackmere